Mahabharat is a 1965 Hindi adventure fantasy film based on the Indian epic Mahabharata, starring Pradeep Kumar, Padmini, Dara Singh, Abhi Bhattacharya, Mahar Desai, Tiwari, and directed by Babubhai Mistri. The score was composed by Chitragupta and the title song was sung by Mohammed Rafi.

The film was dubbed into Tamil with the title Panchali Sabatham and was released in 1966. K. Devanarayanan wrote the dialogues. Kannadasan and Panchu Arunachalam penned the lyrics. Music to the Tamil version was composed by D. Srinivas. The Tamil-language film was produced by N. M. Ramachandran.

Plot
Pandu and Dhirtrashtra are two brothers who rule Hastinapur. Pandu marries Kunti, who conceives five sons and names them Yudhister, Bhimsen, Arjun, Nakul and Sahdev, while Dhirtrashtra, who is blind, marries Gandhari, and gives birth to a 100 sons, including Duryodhan and Dushasan. Gandhari's brother, Shakuni, also resides with them. After Pandu passes away, Dhirtrashtra decides to bequeath the empire to Yudhister much to the chagrin of Duryodhan, who plots with Shakuni to kill them in a palace made of wax, but the brothers and Kunti manage to escape and live incognito in a forest where Bhimsem meets with, Hidimba, slays her demon brother, Hidimb, marries her and sires a son, an illusionist, Ghatotkach. The brothers do reveal their identity when Arjun wins a competition at Panchal to wed Draupadi defeating Duryodhan, Dushashan, Jarasandh and others. Kunti unwittingly asks the brothers to share Draupadi, as she had in a previous birth as Devi Maa Parvati, prayed to Lord Shiva five times for a husband. Dhirtrashtra acknowledges the enmity between the cousins and asks five brothers to re-locate to Khandavprasth, which is subsequently transformed by Devraj Indra's aide, Vishwakarma, and renamed Indraprasht. Duryodhan is then humiliated by Draupadi, who mocks him and tells him that sons of a blind man are also blind, when he stumbles in the Maya Mahal, and he takes a vow to humiliate her. Shakuni then invites the five brothers to gamble at Hastinapur where Yudhister ends up losing Indraprasht, his brothers, his wealth as well as Draupadi herself. Lord Krishna comes to her aid when Dushashan publicly disrobes her as no one comes to her defense. The Pandavas are then sentenced to 13 years in exile, which will be extended by 12 years more if they are discovered during the 13th year. The 13 years pass, Arjun also marries Subhadra and sires a son, Abhimanyu. When the Pandavas return to claim Indraprastha, the Kauravas oppose and challenge them to a war in the Kurkshetra. Duryodhan chooses Lord Krishna's armies, while Arjun chooses Krishna himself, who decides to only be the charioteer for Arjun. And it is here that Lord Krishna who shows his true self to Arjun when he hesitates to kill his relatives, cousins, and gurus. It is here that Gandhari will bless Duryodhan with a body of steel, Kunti will go to plead with Karan to show mercy to her five sons, and Pawanputra Hanuman, the elder brother of Bhima, decides to make an incognito appearance, in this epic battle between Good and Evil.

Cast

Soundtrack
"Bahut Din Beete Puraani Baat Hai" - Mohammed Rafi
"Chakravyuh Ka Chakra Gira Hai" - Mohammed Rafi
"Champakali Chhup Chhup Jaaye Re" - Asha Bhosle
"Hari Hari Dharti Hai" - Lata Mangeshkar
"He Rakhi Bandhnewale Kahan Chhupe Ho" - Mohammed Rafi
"Meri Chhun Chhun Chhun PaayalSun Tujhko Pukaare" - Kamal Barot & Suman Kalyanpur
"O Chanda Aaj Ki Raat Na Dhalana" - Lata Mangeshkar & Mahendra Kapoor
"Sakhi Ri Baaje Man Ki Baansuriya" - Lata Mangeshkar
"Sukh Jaata Hai Dukh Aata Hai" - Mohammed Rafi
"Tan N Dir Dir Dim Dimat Dere Na" - Usha Mangeshkar

Remake
It was remade in Gujarati as Sampoorna Mahabharat in 1983 and dubbed to Hindi, starring Jayshree Gadkar, Arvind kumar.

References

External links

Mahabharat overview University of Iowa.

1965 films
1960s Hindi-language films
Indian epic films
Religious epic films
Films set in ancient India
Films scored by Chitragupta
Films based on the Mahabharata
Hindi films remade in other languages
Films directed by Babubhai Mistry